Shotwell Hall, also known as Fraternity Hall, is a historic dormitory located on the campus of West Liberty University at West Liberty, Ohio County, West Virginia. It was designed by noted Wheeling architect Frederick F. Faris (1870-1927) and built as a Public Works Administration project in 1937.  It is a -story red brick over concrete block building in the Colonial Revival style. It features a broken pediment doorway and pedimented gable ends. The building was built as a men's dormitory, but now houses faculty offices.  The building is named for Nathan Shotwell, first president of West Liberty Academy from 1838 to 1854.

It was listed on the National Register of Historic Places in 1996.

References

See also
 University and college buildings listed on the National Register of Historic Places

Residential buildings completed in 1937
Buildings and structures in Ohio County, West Virginia
Colonial Revival architecture in West Virginia
Public Works Administration in West Virginia
Residential buildings on the National Register of Historic Places in West Virginia
West Liberty University
University and college buildings on the National Register of Historic Places in West Virginia
National Register of Historic Places in Ohio County, West Virginia